Chandlings, or Chandlings Prep School, known until 2007 as Chandlings Manor School, is an independent co-educational preparatory school at Bagley Wood near Kennington, a village south of Oxford.

History
Chandlings was founded in 1994 as a co-educational day-school by the governors of Cothill House  to supplement the preparatory boarding school education for boys at Cothill. In its early years, it was known as Chandlings Manor School.

Present day
The school is operated by the Cothill Education Trust, an educational charity registered in England, which also operates other preparatory schools in England and France.

Chandlings is a co-educational school which has a nursery and a pre-prep department, which delivers an Early Years Foundation Stage programme for children up to year 2, and then a prep department, for years 3 to 6. Pupils are divided into three houses: Richardson (colour: red), Astley (dark blue) and Poltimore (green).

Among the school's facilities are an indoor heated swimming pool, tennis and netball courts, playing fields, a golf course, an area for riding motor quads, stables and extensive woods ideal for woodcraft and nature study and where a new low-ropes course has been built.

Teaching staff include the headmistress, Christine Cook, two deputy heads (pastoral and academic), a senior master and head of girls, a head of pre-prep, more than thirty form teachers, and teachers specializing in English, maths, science, modern languages, history, geography, ICT, classics and philosophy, art, music, drama and religious education, as well as a team of games and sports coaches.

Visiting performers and authors include Cressida Cowell, who spoke about her writing at the school in May 2018.

The Good Schools Guide says: 

In rural surroundings near Oxford, Chandlings and Cothill House School are near enough together to be able to share a bursar and grounds staff.

Publications
Clare Walsh, Get Cooking! (Chandlings Manor School, 2005)

References

External links
Chandlings School website
Cothill Educational Trust website

Preparatory schools in Oxfordshire
Private schools in Oxfordshire
Educational institutions established in 1994
1994 establishments in England